Tyler is an unincorporated community in Tyler County, West Virginia, United States.

The William Wells House was listed on the National Register of Historic Places in 1987.

References

Unincorporated communities in Tyler County, West Virginia
Unincorporated communities in West Virginia